Longworth is a surname. People with the surname include:

Academia
 Norman Longworth (born 1936), British professor in the field of lifelong learning
 Richard Longworth (Cambridge) (died 1579), English churchman and academic, Master of St John's College, Cambridge, and Dean of Chester
 Lewis G. Longsworth (1904–1981), American biochemist, professor at Rockefeller University

Business and commerce
 Francis Longworth, Sr. (1766–1843), Irish-born Canadian businessman and political figure in Prince Edward Island
 Francis Longworth (1807–1883), Canadian merchant, ship builder, and political figure in Prince Edward Island
 John Longworth (businessman) (born 1958), British business consultant
 Nicholas Longworth (winemaker) (1783–1863), Ohio banker, winemaker, and great-grandfather of Nicholas Longworth III
 Joseph Longworth (1813–1883), American real estate magnate and philanthropist, son of Nicholas Longworth (winemaker) and father of Nicholas Longworth II

Fine arts, literature, journalism, and entertainment
 Alice Roosevelt Longworth (1884–1980), American writer, socialite, daughter of Theodore Roosevelt, and wife of Nicholas Longworth III
 Clara Longworth de Chambrun (1873–1954), American arts patron, Shakespeare scholar, daughter of Nicholas Longworth II, and sister of Nicholas Longworth III
 Eric Longworth (1918–2008), British actor
 Helen Longworth (born 1976), British actress
 Karina Longworth (born 1980), Los Angeles-based film critic, and author
 Kate Longworth, Arizona-based Fox Sports reporter
 Richard C. Longworth, American author and journalist
 Shelley Longworth (born 1976), English comedy actress and voice-over artist
 Toby Longworth, British actor

Law
 Nicholas Longworth II (1844–1890), Cincinnati lawyer and Justice of the Ohio Supreme Court
 John Longworth (lawyer) (1814–1885), Canadian lawyer

Public service
 Isabel Frances Longworth (1881–1961), Australian dentist and peace activist
 Nicholas Longworth III (1869–1931), U.S. Congressman from Ohio who became Speaker of the House, son of Nicholas Longworth II

Religion
 Tom Longworth (1891–1977), Anglican bishop

Sports
 Ephraim Longworth (1887–1968), English football player
 William Longworth (1892–1969), Australian Olympian freestyle swimmer
 Bill Longworth (born 1884), English rugby league footballer who played in the 1900s and 1910s

See also
 Longworth family